Léider Calimenio Preciado Guerrero (born 26 February 1977) is a retired Colombian football striker, who currently manages minor league teams (lower divisions) for Independiente Santa Fe.

Club career
He has played for Independiente Santa Fe, Once Caldas, Racing Santander (Spain), CD Toledo (Spain), Deportivo Cali and Al Shabab (Saudi Arabia) as well as for one of the most popular clubs from Ecuador, Sociedad Deportivo Quito. He was part of their 2008 championship team.

Preciado is one of the most important Colombian strikers; he has scored 108 goals for Independiente Santa Fe, 3 of them at the Copa libertadores de América in 2006, and more than 160 goals in his entire career. He was the top scorer of the second half of the Colombian Championship (Torneo Finalización) in 2003 and 2004.

On April 26, 2008, Preciado became one of the 3 leading scorers, besides Miguel Ángel Converti and Alfredo Castillo, in the history of the Bogotá Derby (Independiente Santa Fe vs Club Deportivo Los Millonarios), after scoring in Santa Fe's 2-0 victory over Millonarios. Preciado has 15 goals in this Derby, all of them with Santa Fe.

International career
He played for the Colombia national football team and was a participant in the 1998 FIFA World Cup, where he scored one goal against the Tunisia national football team.

References

1977 births
Living people
Colombian footballers
Colombia international footballers
1998 FIFA World Cup players
Colombian expatriate sportspeople in Spain
Cúcuta Deportivo footballers
Independiente Santa Fe footballers
Racing de Santander players
CD Toledo players
Once Caldas footballers
Deportivo Cali footballers
Al-Shabab FC (Riyadh) players
S.D. Quito footballers
Deportes Quindío footballers
Colombian expatriate footballers
Expatriate footballers in Spain
Expatriate footballers in Ecuador
Expatriate footballers in Saudi Arabia
Categoría Primera A players
La Liga players
People from Tumaco
Association football forwards
Colombian people of African descent
Sportspeople from Nariño Department